Sam Hughes (born March 13, 1970) is a former American football quarterback who played one season with the Miami Hooters of the Arena Football League. He played college football at Louisiana Tech University.

References

External links
Just Sports Stats
College stats

Living people
1970 births
Players of American football from Florida
American football quarterbacks
Louisiana Tech Bulldogs football players
Miami Hooters players
People from Lake Worth Beach, Florida